Stuart Mcbeath Tosh (born 26 September 1948), also known as Stuart Tosh, is a Scottish drummer, songwriter and vocalist. He was born in Aberdeen, Scotland. He recorded and toured with a succession of bands during the 1970s and 1980s, including Pilot, The Alan Parsons Project, 10cc, Camel, and Roger Daltrey.

References

External links
 Stuart Tosh's appearances & credits on different albums at Discogs.com

1948 births
Living people
Scottish drummers
British male drummers
Scottish songwriters
20th-century Scottish male singers
People from Aberdeen
10cc members
Pilot (band) members
The Alan Parsons Project members